"Lady (You Bring Me Up)" is a 1981 hit single by the Commodores. In the United States, it peaked at No. 8 on the Billboard Hot 100 and No. 5 on the Billboard R&B singles chart. It reached No. 56 on the UK Singles Chart.

It was written by Commodores member William King, his wife, Shirley, and Harold Hudson, a member of the Commodores' backing group, The Mean Machine. Lionel Richie sang lead vocals, and it was one of the group's last big hits before he left for a solo career.

Record World noted that Ritchie's vocal is backed by "shimmering strings and a driving rhythm."

The music video features the band members playing a six-a-side soccer match with a group of women players.

Accolades
"Lady (You Bring Me Up)" was Grammy-nominated in the category of Best R&B Performance by a Duo or Group with Vocals.

Track listings
7" single
"Lady (You Bring Me Up)"  – 4:46
"Gettin' It"  – 4:18

Charts

Weekly charts

Year-end charts

References

External links
 

1981 singles
1981 songs
Commodores songs
Song recordings produced by James Anthony Carmichael
Number-one singles in New Zealand
Motown singles
Disco songs